Amborobe is a rural municipality in Madagascar. It belongs to the district of Vohipeno, which is a part of the region of Fitovinany. The population of the municipality was 4,586 in 2018.

This municipality is situated alongside National Road 12 North of Vohipeno.

References 
Loi 2015 - Creation de la Commune

Populated places in Fitovinany